Rosche is a municipality in the district of Uelzen, in Lower Saxony, Germany. It is situated approximately 13 km east of Uelzen.

Rosche is also the seat of the Samtgemeinde ("collective municipality") Rosche.

References

Uelzen (district)